Datuk Aaron Ago anak Dagang (born 12 December 1958) is a Malaysian politician who has served as the Minister of National Unity in the Pakatan Harapan (PH) administration under Prime Minister Anwar Ibrahim since December 2022 and the Member of Parliament (MP) for Kanowit since March 2004. He served as the Deputy Minister of Health II for the second term in the Barisan Nasional (BN) administration under former Prime Minister Ismail Sabri Yaakob and former Minister Khairy Jamaluddin from August 2021 to the collapse of the BN administration in November 2022 and his first term in the Perikatan Nasional (PN) administration under former Prime Minister Muhyiddin Yassin and former Minister Adham Baba from March 2020 to August 2021. He is a member of the Parti Rakyat Sarawak (PRS), a component party of the Gabungan Parti Sarawak (GPS) coalition. 

Before entering the Parliament, he was the political secretary to the former Minister for Energy, Communications and Multimedia, Leo Moggie Irok.  He then replaced Moggie in the Kanowit federal seat when the latter stepped down from politics during the 2004 general elections. After the election, his Sarawak Native People's Party (PBDS) was de-registered, he then joined the Sarawak Progressive Democratic Party (SPDP) and later the PRS. He retained the Kanowit seat in the 2008 election unopposed.

Election results

Honours

Honours of Malaysia
  :
  Commander of the Order of Meritorious Service (PJN) – Datuk (2010)

References

Living people
1958 births
People from Sarawak
Members of the Dewan Rakyat
Iban people
Parti Rakyat Sarawak politicians
Progressive Democratic Party (Malaysia) politicians
Parti Bansa Dayak Sarawak politicians
Commanders of the Order of Meritorious Service
21st-century Malaysian politicians